Dibridsonia is a genus of flowering plants belonging to the family Rubiaceae.

Its native range is Thailand to Western and Central Malesia.

Species:

Dibridsonia conferta 
Dibridsonia culionensis 
Dibridsonia oblongifolia

References

Rubiaceae
Rubiaceae genera